Kalinka Airfield is a civilian airfield located in Khabarovsk Krai, Russia located 23 km east of Khabarovsk near the town of Kalinka.

It was originally Blagodatnoye (Russian: 10-й участок, Kalinka) a former Russian military airbase and was part of the Soviet Air Defence Forces Far Eastern Military District and hosted an interceptor regiment flying Sukhoi Su-9 (NATO: Fishpot) and Mikoyan-Gurevich MiG-17 (NATO: Fresco) aircraft.  It was closed as a military base in 2009.

History
From November 1948 to October 1952, the 582nd Fighter Aviation Regiment was stationed on aircraft flying Lavochkin La-7 (1948-1950), Lend-Lease Bell P-63 Kingcobra (1950) and the Mikoyan-Gurevich MiG-15 (1950-1952). In October 1950, the regiment relocated to the airfield Denshahe (China).

From June 1948 until its disbandment in 1994, the 301st Fighter Aviation Regiment was based on Yakovlev Yak-9, Yakovlev Yak-11, P-63 Kingcobra (1953-1953), MiG-15 (March 1953 to 1955), Mikoyan-Gurevich MiG-17 (September 1953 to 1962), Sukhoi Su-9 (February 1962 to 1976), and the Mikoyan-Gurevich MiG-23MLD (1976 to 1994).

From 1968 until its disbandment in 1988, the 26th Guards Aviation Regiment of fighter-bombers (26th Guards Bomber Aviation Regiment since 1979) was based on the Sukhoi Su-7 (1968–1972) and Sukhoi Su-17 (1972) aircraft (until 1979), and the Sukhoi Su-24 (1979 to 1988).

From 1988 to 1998, the 216th Fighter Aviation Regiment was based at the airfield, using Sukhoi Su-27 aircraft.

From 2010 onward, the airfield was no longer used for military purposes. Civilian operators include the Federation of Aviation Sports of the Far East, ChelAvia-Vostok, Representative Office of the Khabarovsk Regional Branch of AOPA-Russia.  Satellite imagery shows the maintained portion of the runway was shortened to 800 m (2600 ft).

References

Russian Air Force bases
Soviet Air Force bases
Soviet Air Defence Force bases